The governor of Bourbon or La Réunion was a French colonial role. When the island became a French overseas department in 1946, the role was replaced by a prefect.

For the French West India Company

For the king of France

French Revolution and British occupation

Bourbon Restoration to Second French Empire

French Third Republic

External links
 List of governors of the île de la Réunion on www.ile-bourbon.net.